Natalie Weir (born 1967, Townsville, Queensland) is an Australian choreographer, and Artistic Director for the Expressions Dance Company in Australia.

Education and career
Natalie Weir began her dance training with Ann Roberts and performed with Roberts' North Queensland Ballet Company (now Dancenorth) in Townsville. She then attended Kelvin Grove College (now Queensland University of Technology) studying under Sietsma, and moved to Sietsma's Expressions Dance Company as founding member.

Weir has choreographed for the Queensland Ballet (from 1994) and The Australian Ballet (from 2000) (both as resident choreographer); and also choreographed for the American Ballet Theatre, Houston Ballet, Hong Kong Ballet, Singapore Dance Theatre, Tanzcompagnie Giessen, the Royal Ballet School, Queensland Ballet, West Australian Ballet, Queensland Ballet, the Australian Dance Theatre, Dancenorth, and Tasdance.
She is Artistic Director of the Australian Expressions Dance Company with a contemporary dance repertoire.

Works
Weir has choreographed both original works and restaged a number of older works:
 Expressions Dance Company
 Jigsaw, (1999 and 2007), choreographer: Natalie Weir
 The Australian Ballet
 Dark Lullaby, (1998)
 Mirror, Mirror, (2000)
 Carmina Burana, (2001)
 Royal Academy of Dance's Genee competition 2002
 created the contemporary male and female solos
 American Ballet Theatre
 Jabula
 a contribution to the Harrison Project Within You Without You
 a solo for Ethan Stiefel, performed at the International Ballet Festival Mariinsky
 Heaven, (2003) danced to John Adams' Harmonium, as part one of a two act work called HereAfter.
 Houston Ballet
 In a Whisper, (2000)
 Steppenwolf, (2001)
 The Host (2004);
 Hong Kong Ballet
 Turandot, (2003)
 Madama Butterfly
 Singapore Dance Theatre
 a restaging of Dark Lullaby, (2003)
 Tanzcompagnie Giessen
 Icarus
 Royal Ballet School
 Jabula
 Unwritten
 Queensland Ballet
 Wuthering Heights
 Petroushka
 Tasdance
 In Her Footsteps
 West Australian Ballet
 Lacrimosa
 Queensland Ballet
 Orpheus.

References

External links
 Expressions Dance Company: Press Release Natalie Weir to be Artistic Director
 

Australian choreographers
Contemporary dance choreographers
Culture of Brisbane
People from Townsville
1967 births
Living people
Ballet choreographers
Queensland University of Technology alumni
Helpmann Award winners